Deshamanya Edward Lionel Senanayake (known commonly as E.L Senanayake)  (8 August 1920 – 29 January 2000) was a Sri Lankan politician belonging to the United National Party. He was the 12th Speaker of the Sri Lankan Parliament. Senanayake was the Governor of North Central Province and Central Province of Sri Lanka. He was elected to the Sri Lankan Parliament from Mahanuwara in Kandy.

He was the son of Gate Mudaliyar James Senanayake and was educated at Trinity College, Kandy and at the University College, Colombo graduating with an honours degree in Economics.

Early life and education
Born at Milton House, Castle Street, Kandy to Wasala Mudaliyar James Senanayake; he was educated at Trinity College, Kandy and at the University College, Colombo graduating with an honours degree in Economics.

Political career
He was elected to the Kandy Municipal Council in 1943. In 1946 he was elected as the Deputy Mayor of Kandy and was elected Mayor of Kandy in 1950 as the country’s youngest mayor. During his tenor the new Kandy Central Market was constructed, the Kandy water supply scheme at Getambe, the D.S. Senanayake Public Library, the E.L. Senanayake Children's Library, the Auditorium and the E. L. Senanayake Children's Park at Ampitiya. 

He was elected to parliament from the 1953 general election from the United National Party. He lost his seat in the 1956 general election, but was re-elected in the March 1960 general election and retained his seat in the next consecutive elections and remained member of parliament till 1988. He served as Health Minister and Minister of Agriculture and Lands, before being elected Speaker of the Parliament. Following his retirement politics he was appointed Governor of the North Central Province and thereafter Governor of Sabaragamuwa. He was awarded the title of Deshamanya by the President of Sri Lanka.

Family
His brother Dr James Senanayake was a member of the Senate of Ceylon and his younger brother Earnest Senanayake served as a Member of the Kandy Municipal Council. He was married to Seetha Senanayake, who served as his private secretary. Two of their sons Dhathusena and Rajasinghe served as Members of the Kandy Municipal Council, while another son Kesera served as a diplomat and was a member of the Central Provincial Council. His family donated the Miltion Senanayake Memorial Library at Trinity College Kandy, a ward at the Mahaiyawa Home for Elders, contributions towards the Pothgul Viharaya at Malabar Street Kandy and the YMCA building at Sangaraja Mawatha Kandy.

References

1920 births
2000 deaths
Governors of North Central Province, Sri Lanka
Governors of Central Province, Sri Lanka
Speakers of the Parliament of Sri Lanka
Sri Lankan Buddhists
United National Party politicians
Members of the 6th Parliament of Ceylon
Members of the 8th Parliament of Sri Lanka
Alumni of Trinity College, Kandy
Alumni of the Ceylon University College
Agriculture ministers of Sri Lanka
Politicians from Kandy
Mayors of Kandy
Deshamanya
Sinhalese politicians